MZR is the brand name of a generation of Inline-four engines engineered and built by the Mazda Motor Corporation from 2001 to the present. MZR stands for "MaZda Responsive". The MZR generation includes gasoline and diesel powered engines ranging in displacements from 1.3L to 2.5L.

All gasoline-powered MZR engines feature an all-aluminum block construction with iron cylinder liners. The diesel MZR-CD engines use a cast-iron block (virtually identical to the Mazda F engine) and an aluminum cylinder head.

Variants
There are three specific engine families within the MZR which include:
 the small 1.3L to 1.6L Mazda Z engine
 the mid-sized 1.8L to 2.5L Mazda L engine
 the 2.0L and 2.2L common-rail diesel Mazda R-engine

The DISI turbocharged MZR L3-VDT was on the Ward's 10 Best Engines list for 3 consecutive years for 2006, 2007 and 2008.

Licenced to Ford
The Ford Motor Company owned rights to build and use the MZR generation of engines under their Duratec brand name for global service in its vehicles since 2003.

Discontinued
As of 2011, Mazda discontinued development of the MZR generation of engines and began to replace it with their SkyActiv generation of engines.

Applications:

 2005-2015 Mazda Roadster/Miata/MX-5
 2003-2013 Mazda3

See also
 List of Mazda engines

References
MAZDA engine codes

MZR
Straight-four engines